Madhuchandralekha is a 2006 Indian Malayalam-language comedy-drama film directed by Rajasenan and written by Raghunath Paleri. It stars Jayaram, Urvashi, and Mamta Mohandas in the title roles as Madhu, Chandramathi, and Indulekha. The music was composed by M. Jayachandran. The film is a remake of the Korean film My Wife. This is the 15th film in which Rajasenan and Jayaram have worked together. Also Madhuchandralekha was a success at the box office.

Plot

Madhu aka Madhavan is a successful playback singer. Chandramathi is his illiterate, rustic, a coarse, betel chewing wife with a bad habit of spitting in inappropriate places, and they have four children. She has a clutch of equally coarse brothers and grandma. Theirs was an incompatible matrimony but still a happy one. She had in fact fallen in love with her music teacher Madhavan, and one day, Chandramathi kissed him in public and that incident forced him to marry her. Madhu loves his wife even though they are out of sync because she has brought him luck. Madhavan and the kids tolerate her, as she even spits betel juice accidentally on others and is known in party circles as "kolambi".

Here enters Lekha, a sophisticated urban model-cum-singer, an ardent lover of Madhu's music, who finds a place in the hearts of all the family members. Kids starts to avoid Chandramathi because they want a stylish mammy like Lekha. Chandra is aware of their incompatibility in the changed scenario, and attempts to improve, even trying her hand at learning English. At last, Chandramathi thinks Lekha will be the perfect wife for her husband and a good mother for her children. For uniting Madhu and Lekha she leaves home with her younger child Kingini. This incident totally changes Madhu's life.

Chandramathi moves to her uncle's home. Even though at the end she couldn't suffer the pain of giving her husband to another woman. With the help of Chandramathi's uncle, Madhu and Lekha made a plan to take her back to children and Madhu. In the end she enters to Madhu and Lekha's wedding ceremony and cried off. There reveals it all was based on a plan and Madhu loves his wife that much. Finally he marries Chandramathi once again.

Cast
 Jayaram as Madhavan aka Madhu
 Urvashi as Chandramathi
 Mamta as Indulekha
 Cochin Haneefa as Abootty
 Indrans as Lukose
 Sudheer Sukumaran as Rishi
 Harisree Asokan as Digambaran
 Kundara Johny as Shanmugham
 Bheeman Raghu as Arumugham
 Sukumari as Chandramathi's grandmother
 Kalasala Babu as Ramu
 Vijayakumari as Chandramathi's mother
Anslal K A  as running child 4

Awards
Kerala State Film  Award
 Best Actress- Urvashi

Soundtrack 
The film's soundtrack contains 7 songs, all composed by M. Jayachandran. Lyrics by Gireesh Puthenchery and Kanesh Punoor.

References

External links
 

2006 films
2000s Malayalam-language films
Films directed by Rajasenan
Films scored by M. Jayachandran